Arsenical copper contains up to 0.5% arsenic which, at elevated temperatures, imparts higher tensile strength and a reduced tendency to scaling. It is typically specified in boiler work, especially locomotive fireboxes. It also helps prevent embrittlement of oxygen free copper by bismuth, antimony and lead by the formation of complex oxides.  Copper with a larger percentage of arsenic is called arsenical bronze, which can be work-hardened much harder than copper.

See also 
Arsenical bronze
Arsenical brass

References 

Copper alloys
Steam boilers
Coinage metals and alloys
Arsenic